The 1990 World Junior Figure Skating Championships were held from November 28 to December 3, 1989 in Colorado Springs, Colorado, United States. The event was sanctioned by the International Skating Union and open to ISU member nations. Medals were awarded in the disciplines of men's singles, ladies' singles, pair skating, and ice dancing.

Results

Men

Ladies

Pairs

Ice dancing

References

World Junior Figure Skating Championships
1989 in figure skating
1990 in figure skating
International figure skating competitions hosted by the United States
Bronco Colorado